David Henry Arthur Nicolson, 4th Baron Carnock (10 July 1920 – 26 December 2008) was a British peer and solicitor.

The son of the 3rd Baron Carnock and Hon. Katharine Frederica Albertha Lopes, he was educated at Winchester College and Balliol College, Oxford. Nicolson served in the Royal Devon Yeomanry, reaching the rank of major and fought in the Second World War. From 1955 to 1986, he was a partner in Clifford Turner. On 2 October 1982, he succeeded to his father's titles and became Chief of Clan Nicolson. Two years later the dormant Baronetcy, of Lasswade in the County of Midlothian was revived in his favour. He was succeeded by his cousin, the writer Adam Nicolson.

References 

1920 births
2008 deaths
Alumni of Balliol College, Oxford
4
British Army personnel of World War II
People educated at Winchester College
David
Royal Devon Yeomanry officers
Carnock